The 1966–67 Idaho Vandals men's basketball team represented the University of Idaho during the 1966–67 NCAA University Division basketball season. Charter members of the Big Sky Conference, the Vandals were led by first-year head coach Wayne Anderson and played their home games on campus at the Memorial Gymnasium in Moscow, Idaho. They were 15–12 overall and 5–5 in conference play.

Alumnus Anderson had been an assistant (and head baseball coach) for nine years at Idaho. He was promoted in September 1966, stepped down as baseball coach, and led the basketball program for eight years.

References

External links
Sports Reference – Idaho Vandals: 1966–67 basketball season
Gem of the Mountains: 1967 University of Idaho yearbook – 1966–67 basketball season
Idaho Argonaut – student newspaper – 1967 editions

Idaho Vandals men's basketball seasons
Idaho
Idaho
Idaho